St. Peter's AME Zion Church is a historic African Methodist Episcopal church located at 615 Queen Street in New Bern, Craven County, North Carolina.  It was built between 1923 and 1942, on the site of the 1914 church building which was destroyed by fire in 1922.  It is a large three bay by seven bay, rectangular brick church building in the Late Gothic Revival style.  It features a gabled nave flanked by two-story truncated stair towers. Also on the property is the contributing 1926 parsonage; a -story, frame American Craftsman style dwelling. It is known within the denomination as the "Mother Church of Zion Methodism in the South," and the oldest existing African Methodist Episcopal congregation in the South.

It was listed on the National Register of Historic Places in 1997.

References

African-American history of North Carolina
African Methodist Episcopal churches in North Carolina
Churches in New Bern, North Carolina
Churches on the National Register of Historic Places in North Carolina
Churches completed in 1942
Houses completed in 1926
20th-century African Methodist Episcopal church buildings
National Register of Historic Places in Craven County, North Carolina
1942 establishments in North Carolina